In the Elizabethan era (1558–1603), there was a wide range of leisure activities entertaining both the nobility and the common classes. Among these leisure activities were animal fighting, team sports, individual sports, games, dramatics, music and the arts.

Blood sports
A variety of pastimes which would now be considered blood sports were popular. Cock fighting was a common pastime, and the bets on this game could amount to thousands of pounds, an exorbitant amount of money in those days, and many respectable gentlemen lost all their money this way. Henry VIII had a royal cockpit built at one of his palaces.

Young boys on Shrove Tuesday would normally bring in their own fighting rooster and would spend the afternoon at school placing bets on which rooster would win. The most famous cock-pit in London was in Drury Lane, and most towns and villages had their own pit. 

There were other common animal sports: bear-baiting, bullfighting, dog fighting, and cock throwing.
Bowls was also extremely popular in the Elizabethan era.

Hunting 
Various types of hunting were popular with the nobility. The stag, boar, roe, buck, badgers, otters, hares, and foxes were also hunted. Greyhounds and Irish Wolfhounds were common for hunting.

For the upper class, hawking was a popular sport. Much time was spent on training a hawk or falcon, and keeping it in good condition, requiring many pieces of expensive, specialized equipment, making it too expensive for the lower classes.  

Queen Elizabeth I was very fond of both hunting and hawking

Team sports
Elizabethan style football was comparable to the present-day sports of rugby union and rugby league. Two teams rushed against each other, trying to get the "ball" in through the goalposts. "Cudgels" was also a popular sport among young men. A type of stick fighting, it was a sport effectively training for sword fighting, but using wooden wasters or simple cudgels.

Individual sports
Running, jumping, fencing, jousting, archery, and skittles were also practiced, with fishing as the most relaxing and harmless pastime.

Children enjoyed playing leap-frog, blind man's bluff and hide-and-seek, which are enjoyed by many children throughout Britain even today.

Games
Elizabethans enjoyed playing cards, with a game called triumph (modern day whist) being popular. Dice, backgammon and draughts were also played. Men mostly played these games as it was deemed inappropriate for a woman to gamble; however, Queen Elizabeth the first enjoyed playing cards and was an avid gambler. Elizabethans bet on these games with different currencies, mainly including money.

Music and dance
Music was greatly enjoyed throughout this era, as seen through quite a few family evenings including musical performances. Children were taught to sing and dance at a very early age and became used to performing in public during such evenings. Keyboard instruments such as harpsichords, clavichords, dulcimers and virginals were played. Woodwind instruments like woodsy, crumhorns, flutes and stringed instruments such as lutes and rebecs were also widely used.

Court dances included the pavane and galliard, the almain and the volta, whilst among popular dances were the branle, The Barley-Break (a setting by William Byrd is in My Ladye Nevells Booke), Nobody’s Jig (of which a version was set by Richard Farnaby) and the Shake-a-Trot.

Theatre

The plays were an extremely popular pastime, with William Shakespeare's plays taking the lead in audience. Quite a few theatres were built in and around London at this time including "The Globe", "The Swan" and "The Fortune". Little scenery was used but props were used widely. The props were quite realistic, with innards of pigs being strewn across the stage when a man's body was shown to be cut open.

Footnotes

Elizabethan era
Sport in England
History of sports
Leisure